John Louis Bland (born 22 September 1945) is a South African professional golfer who has won more than thirty professional tournaments around the world.

Bland was born in Johannesburg. Turning professional in 1969, he was a leading player on the Southern African Tour for over twenty years. He spent the northern summers playing on the European Tour, where he won twice. He was a more consistent contender than this tally might suggest, as he finished in the top-20 on the Order of Merit six times.

After reaching the age of fifty in 1995, Bland played mainly on the United States-based Champions Tour. He won five tournaments in this venue, including four in 1996, when he finished third on the money list. He has also won three tournaments on the European Senior Tour.

Professional wins (36)

European Tour wins (2)

Sunshine Tour wins (19)
1977 South African PGA Championship, Victoria Falls Classic, Holiday Inns Invitational
1979 Holiday Inns Invitational
1981 Sigma Series 2, Sigma Series 3
1983 Holiday Inns Invitational, Kodak Classic
1984 Goodyear Classic
1987 Goodyear Classic
1988 Trustbank Tournament of Champions, Safmarine Masters
1989 Dewar's White Label Trophy
1990 Dewar's White Label Trophy, Minolta Match Play, Spoomet Bloemfontein Classic
1991 Palabora Classic, Bell's Cup, Trustbank Tournament of Champions

Challenge Tour wins (1)
1991 Martini Open

Other wins (2)
1970 Transvaal Open
1976 Holiday Inns Champion of Champions

Senior PGA Tour wins (5)

Senior PGA Tour playoff record (1–1)

European Senior Tour wins (3)

European Senior Tour playoff record (1–1)

Other senior wins (4)
1997 Liberty Mutual Legends of Golf (with Graham Marsh), Franklin Templeton Senior South African Open
1998 Franklin Templeton Senior South African Open
2010 Liberty Mutual Legends of Golf – Raphael Division (with Graham Marsh)

Results in major championships

Note: Bland only played in The Open Championship.
CUT = missed the half-way cut (3rd round cut in 1979, 1981, 1982, 1983 and 1984 Open Championships)
"T" = tied

Team appearances
World Cup (representing South Africa): 1975
Hennessy Cognac Cup (representing the Rest of the World): 1982
Dunhill Cup (representing South Africa): 1991, 1992

References

External links

South African male golfers
Sunshine Tour golfers
European Tour golfers
European Senior Tour golfers
PGA Tour Champions golfers
Golfers from Johannesburg
Sportspeople from the Western Cape
People from Knysna
1945 births
Living people